Woolworth Estate is a historic estate located at Glen Cove in Nassau County, New York. It was designed in 1916 by architect C. P. H. Gilbert (1861–1952) for Frank Winfield Woolworth (1852–1919). The estate consists of the main residence, known as Winfield Hall; a large garage with remodeled living quarters; a main entrance arch; two greenhouses; and various landscape features including a tea house.

Winfield Hall
When his current home was destroyed by a mysterious fire, Woolworth immediately went to work on building Winfield Hall, the plans for which were already drawn. With walls and pillars of marble, the house ended up costing nine million dollars, the grand staircase alone costing two million dollars.

The  house is an Italian Renaissance style, marble covered residence with a five bay wide central mass and flanking four bay wide wings. It features a one bay central entrance portico and flat roof. After the Woolworths moved on, the house sat empty for years, and was  purchased in 1929 by the wife of Richard S. Reynolds, of the R.S. Reynolds Metal Company fame. After her tenure, the house became the Grace Downs Academy, a business school for young ladies, then in 1978 was purchased by Martin T. Carey, brother to former Governor Hugh Carey of New York.

It was listed on the National Register of Historic Places in 1979. Part of the home was heavily damaged by fire on January 28, 2015.

Ghostlore
Winfield Hall, like many other Long Island mansions, has ghostlore associated with it. It is said that on the evening of May 2, 1917, as Edna Woolworth Hutton, Frank Woolworth's middle daughter, took her own life at The Plaza Hotel in New York City, while her father was at Winfield Hall hosting a party, a somewhat bizarre and unexplained incident occurred. Located above Winfield Hall's main entrance fireplace, the marble family crest, containing the painted faces of his three daughters, acquired a crack through the face of Edna, leaving the two remaining faces, as well as the rest of the crest, untouched. A lightning bolt, the product of a severe thunderstorm, has been attributed as the cause of this crack. Shortly thereafter, stories of hearing strange noises in Winfield Hall, as well as reported observations of seeing a floating "spirit" wandering through the halls, began to circulate. Later, when Winfield Hall was being used as a business school for women, there were numerous reports of hearing a woman crying in the locked "Marie Antoinette" room, rumored to be the room where Edna Hutton had committed suicide, though her obituary states her death occurred elsewhere. Other people have reported hearing organ music playing on its own, while detailed descriptions of seeing what appears to be the ghost of a young woman "haunting" the gardens have also been noted.

Popular culture 
The estate was the setting for the promotional commercial of the professional wrestling video game, WWE 2K20, which depicted a cocktail party scene featuring various current and legendary WWE wrestlers, including the game's cover stars, Roman Reigns and Becky Lynch. Taylor Swift's music video for Blank Space was filmed on the grounds of the mansion.

References

Houses on the National Register of Historic Places in New York (state)
Renaissance Revival architecture in New York (state)
Houses completed in 1916
Houses in Nassau County, New York
Glen Cove, New York
Woolworth family
National Register of Historic Places in Oyster Bay (town), New York
1916 establishments in New York (state)